The World Team Olympiad was a contract bridge meet organized by the World Bridge Federation every four years from 1960 to 2004. Its main events were world championships for national teams, always including one open and one restricted to women ("Open" and "Women" categories in WBF terms). A parallel event for seniors was inaugurated in 2000.

Although the Olympiad has been discontinued, its main constituent championships continue within or beside the World Mind Sports Games, first held October 2008 in Beijing, China, and the subsequent results are listed here. In 2016, the events were run separately, as the World Bridge Games, in Wrocław, Poland.

The 1960 "Olympiad" was the first meet organized by the WBF, although the organization has adopted one older event that now confers the title World Champion, the Bermuda Bowl competition.

The Olympiad championships differed from other world-level championships for "national"

teams primarily by inviting every WBF member country to enter a team in each tournament. Other world championships, including the older Bermuda Bowl for open teams that is now contested every odd-number year, require qualification at a "zone" level. For example, about 40 national open teams from European Bridge League member countries may compete biennially for about six entries in the Bermuda Bowl tournament.

Over the twelve World Team Olympiad cycles, the fields grew from 29 open and 14 women teams in 1960 to 72 open, 43 women, and 29 seniors teams in 2004. For the first World Mind Sports Games there were 71 open and 54 women entries; the Seniors International Cup continued as a non-medal event with 32 entries. Seniors participation increased to 34 at the second WMSG in 2012 while the numbers of open and women entries dropped to 60 and 43.

Open Teams

Teams representing Italy and France won five and four of the twelve Open Team Olympiad tournaments. The Italian Blue Team won three in a row 1964 to 1972, overlapping its run of ten Bermuda Bowls (1957–1969). Another Italian team won the last two Olympiads and made it three in a row in the first rendition as part of the World Mind Sports Games, 2000 to 2008, overlapping its run of seven European championships (1995–2006).

* Soulet–Szwarc in 1980, Adad–Aujaleu in 1992, and De Falco–Ferraro in 2000 did not play enough boards to qualify for the title of World Champion
** Van der Neut and Nooijen in 1992 did not play enough boards to qualify for third place
*** Panelewen and Watulingas in 1996 did not play enough boards to qualify for second place

Women Teams

Teams representing eight different countries won the Olympiad series for Women during its twelve renditions, led by the United States with four. England won the first rendition as part of the World Mind Sports Games, beating host China by one IMP in 2008.

* Brunner–Davies in 1980 and Halatcheva–Ivanova in 1988 did not play enough boards in order to qualify for third place
** Scarborough and Scott-Jones in 1984 did not play enough boards in order to qualify for second place
*** Gyimesi and Smederevac in 1992 did not play enough boards in order to qualify for the title of World Champion

Senior International Cup

Teams representing the United States won both renditions of the Senior International Cup. From 2008 the World Bridge Federation continues the tournament in conjunction with the World Mind Sports Games although it is not a WMSG event.

Currently "a bridge a player belongs to the 'Seniors' category if he has
at least his 60th birthday in the calendar year in question." For the next rendition (2012) players born in 1952 or earlier will be eligible. (The threshold increased one year annually from 2005 to 2010.)

 *Hungary captain Barany played the last segment of the first knockout match  but the team otherwise used four players. In their preliminary group of 17 teams Dumbovich–Kovács and Magyar–Szappanos were two of only three pairs who played all 16 matches of the six-day round-robin (256 deals).

World Mind Sports Games

After the 2004 Olympiad, the WBF and the world governing bodies for three other games—chess, draughts, and go—established the International Mind Sports Association and initiated its first priority, the quadrennial World Mind Sports Games (WMSG). The first WMSG were held in Beijing October 2008, about two months after the summer Olympic Games.

Thus a WBF initiative to integrate bridge with the Olympics was abandoned in favor of a long-term goal, advancing the WMSG as a "stepping stone on the path of introducing a third kind of Olympic Games (after the Summer and the Winter Olympics)". The multi-event "World Team Olympiad" was discontinued in favor of participation in the WMSG but the constituent events of the Olympiad continue—Teams championships in Open and Women categories as part of the WMSG; in Seniors and Transnational categories as non-medal side events.

See also
Bermuda Bowl
Venice Cup
Senior Bowl
Bridge at the 2008 World Mind Sports Games
Bridge at the 2012 World Mind Sports Games
World Bridge Games

Notes

References

External links
World Team Olympiad at the World Bridge Federation
World Bridge Games at the World Bridge Federation —Bridge at the World Mind Sports Games

Team Olympiad